Agrotera basinotata is a moth of the family Crambidae described by George Hampson in 1891. It is native to Queensland, Thailand, Hong Kong and Japan, but was introduced to Hawaii for the control of Melastoma malabathricum.

The wingspan is about 20 mm. Adults have brown wings with a cream and yellow pattern near the base. The wing margins are chequered. The abdomen has cream and yellow banding, and a brown tip.

The larvae feed on Melastoma malabathricum, but also Syzygium buxifolium.

External links

Herbison-Evans, Don & Crossley, Stella (20 November 2007). "Agrotera basinotata Hampson, 1891". Australian Caterpillars and their Butterflies and Moths. Retrieved 9 March 2018.
Japanese Moths

Spilomelinae
Moths of Asia
Moths of Australia
Moths described in 1891